Rauscher is a German surname. Notable people with the surname include:

Andreas Rauscher (born 1978), Austrian footballer
Christina Rauscher (1570-1618), German official and critic of witch trials
Elizabeth Rauscher, American physicist
Frank Rauscher III, cancer researcher
Franz Rauscher (1900–1988), Austrian politician
Frederick Rauscher (born 1961), American philosopher
Joseph Othmar Rauscher (1797–1875), Austrian Prince-Archbishop of Vienna
Mario Rauscher (born 1984), Austrian artistic gymnast

See also
Briggs–Rauscher reaction

German-language surnames